Jennifer Gilmore is a Swiss-born American novelist.

Early life 
Gilmore was born in Geneva, Switzerland.

Education 
Gilmore received her Bachelor of Arts from Brandeis University in 1992 and her Master of Fine Arts in fiction from Cornell University in 1997.

Career
Gilmore's first novel, Golden Country, was published by Scribner in 2006 and was a New York Times Notable Book, a finalist for the Los Angeles Times Book Prize, and a finalist for the National Jewish Book Award.

Her second novel, Something Red, was published by Scribner in March 2010 and received glowing reviews from the Los Angeles Times, the Washington Post, O, the Oprah magazine, the New Yorker, Vanity Fair, and more.  Mariner Books, an imprint of Houghton Mifflin Harcourt, published the paperback in March 2011.

Gilmore's work has appeared in many anthologies and magazines including The New York Times Magazine, The New York Times Book Review, the Los Angeles Times, Bookforum, Nerve and Salon.

Personal
Gilmore lives in Easton, Pennsylvania with her husband, the painter, Pedro Barbeito.

Works
 Golden Country, Orlando: Harcourt, 2007. , 
 Something Red, Boston: Mariner Books, 2010. , 
 Mothers., Scribner, 2014. , 
 If Only, New York, NY: HarperTeen, 2018. ,

References

Additional sources 

 Gilmore, Jennifer; Jewish Family Christmas, The New York Times, 2006-12-24, retrieved 2008-04-21
 Gilmore, Jennifer; Golden Country: A Novel, Simon & Schuster, retrieved 2008-04-21
 Gilmore, Jennifer;  Small, Good Bits, blog, 2006-08-29, retrieved 2008-04-21
  Video, retrieved 2008-04-21

External links 
 Jennifer Gilmore at goodreads.com

Cornell University alumni
1970 births
Jewish American writers
Living people
American women novelists
Brandeis University alumni
Swiss emigrants to the United States